Martin Bongo (born July 4, 1940) is a Gabon political figure and diplomat. He was the Foreign Minister of Gabon from 1976 to 1989.

Bongo, a nephew of President Omar Bongo, was born in Lekei, located in Haut-Ogooué Province. In 1989, President Bongo appointed his son, Ali-Ben Bongo, to succeed Martin Bongo as Minister of Foreign Affairs.

Bongo was the Special Representative of the African Union to the Democratic Republic of Congo as of 2003.

References

1940 births
Living people
Foreign ministers of Gabon
21st-century Gabonese people